Jan Hendrik "Rob" Bats (born 1 April 1962 in Winterswijk) is a Dutch politician. He is a member of the People's Party for Freedom and Democracy (VVD). From 1 May 2012 to 1 April 2013 he was mayor of Haren, Groningen. Previously he worked as a civil servant in Sint Maarten.

From 2002 to 2006, he was a member of the municipal council of Meppel. During this time he was also corporate director of the Thorbecke Academy for public administration and public management. From 2007 to 2010, he was a representative for the States Deputed of the province of Drenthe.

Rob Bats studied public administration at the University of Twente. He is married and has two sons.

References 
  'Nieuwe burgemeester Bats in mei aan de slag', Algemeen Dagblad, March 2, 2012

1962 births
Living people
Dutch civil servants
Dutch corporate directors
Dutch public administration scholars
Mayors in Groningen (province)
Municipal councillors in Drenthe
People from Haren, Groningen
People from Winterswijk
People's Party for Freedom and Democracy politicians
Members of the Provincial-Executive of Drenthe
University of Twente alumni